Chrysostome Liausu, SS.CC., (born Charles-Auguste Liausu; 17 March 1807 – 5 September 1839) was a French Catholic priest of the Congregation of the Sacred Hearts of Jesus and Mary, a religious institute of the Roman Catholic Church. He helped start the Roman Catholic mission in the Eastern Oceania and was the Prefect Apostolic of Southern Oceania.

Biography
Liausu was born Charles-Auguste Liausu on 17 March 1807 in La Gardelle, in the Lot department in south-western France. Liausu joined the Congregation of the Sacred Hearts of Jesus and Mary in 1825 and took the name Jean-Chrysostome, presumably after Saint John Chrysostom. He was a cousin of Cyprien Liausu, who also became a Picpus missionary in the Gambier Islands.

Liausu was part of a small group of French Picpus missionaries sent by Pope Gregory XVI and the Propaganda Fide to convert the natives of Eastern Oceania. Their superior Étienne Jérôme Rouchouze was appointed the Vicar Apostolic of Eastern Oceania while Liausu was appointed prefect apostolic of the region south of the equator including the Gambier Islands, the Marquesas Islands, the Tuamotu Islands and the Society Islands and Alexis Bachelot was charged with the region north of the equator (i.e. the Hawaiian Islands). In 1834, Liausu and François Caret, Honoré Laval and Columba Murphy arrived in Valparaíso from Bordeaux. Caret and Laval with Murphy as their assistant were sent to the Gambier Islands while Liausu stayed behind to maintain connection between the missionaries and the Congregation back home and to wait for the arrival of Bishop Rouchouze, who was arriving at a later time. Although initially faced with hostility from Mangareva's King Maputeoa, the three Catholic missionaries managed to land on a small island where the local chief and later Maputeoa's uncle Matua gave them support to learn the Mangareva language and the islanders learned about Christianity. Within one of year of their arrival, the missionaries converted the islanders at Taravai, Aukena and Akamaru to Christianity, established churches, and even made the islanders wear tunics. Maputeoa and his family were baptized on 25 August 1836.

In 1839, he contracted typhus through his work with the Chilean soldiers. Liausu died 5 September 1839 in Valparaíso having never made it to the Gambier Islands.

References

Bibliography

1807 births
1839 deaths
19th-century French Roman Catholic priests
French Roman Catholic missionaries
Roman Catholic missionaries in Chile
Picpus Fathers
People from Lot (department)
Deaths from typhus
French expatriates in Chile
Infectious disease deaths in Chile